The Brazil lunar sample displays are two commemorative plaques consisting of small fragments of Moon specimen brought back with the Apollo 11 and Apollo 17 Moon missions and given in the 1970s to the people of the country of Brazil by United States President Richard Nixon as goodwill gifts.

Description

Apollo 11

Apollo 17

History 

The Brazil Apollo 17 "goodwill Moon rock" plaque display is held in the state of Rio Grande do Sul by the Museum Dom Diogo de Souza in Bagé; the museum acquired it from Brazilian President Emilio Medici Garrastazu. The display is a source of pride for the city.

As of 2002, the building in which the Brazil Apollo 17 lunar sample display is stored was a dilapidated nineteenth-century structure. When an idea to sell the display to raise money emerged in 2000, the residents of the city protested and the plan was withdrawn. The display is rarely exhibited.

See also
 List of Apollo lunar sample displays

References

Further reading

External links 
 Partial list of Apollo  11, 12, 14, 15, 16, and 17 sample locations, NASA Johnson Space Center

Stolen and missing moon rocks
Brazil–United States relations
Space program of Brazil